Se'ergu (Mandarin: 色尔古镇) is a town in Heishui County, Ngawa Tibetan and Qiang Autonomous Prefecture, Sichuan, China. In 2010, Se'ergu had a total population of 2,813: 1,486 males and 1,327 females: 642 aged under 14, 1,981 aged between 15 and 65 and 190 aged over 65.

References 
 

 

 
Towns in Sichuan
Ngawa Tibetan and Qiang Autonomous Prefecture